The General Health Questionnaire (GHQ) is a psychometric screening tool to identify common psychiatric conditions.

It has been translated and validated in at least two languages in addition to English, including Spanish and Persian. The latter used in different fields and generations. Also, using GHQ was beneficial in high-tech systems personnel.

The questionnaire comprises a number of questions, each with a four-point Likert scale for responses.  There are versions with 12, 28, 30 and 60 questions.  It is considered valid for use on adults and adolescents, but not children, and is available on purchase.

References

Health surveys
Mental disorders screening and assessment tools